Madawaska is a town in Aroostook County, Maine, United States. The population was 3,867 at the 2020 census. Madawaska is opposite Edmundston, Madawaska County in New Brunswick, Canada, to which it is connected by the Edmundston–Madawaska Bridge over the Saint John River. The majority of its residents speak French; 83.4% of the population speak French at home.

History

During the early colonial period, Madawaska was a meeting place and hunting/fishing area for the Maliseet (Wolastoqiyik) nation. Later, it was at the center of the bloodless Aroostook War. The final border between the two countries was established with the Webster-Ashburton Treaty of 1842, which gave Maine most of the disputed area, and gave the British a militarily vital connection between the province of Quebec and the province of New Brunswick. Many families were left divided after the settlement.

Economy

Madawaska is a rural town whose economy centers on the Saint John River paper industry. The river historically provided water power for the mills and was the route of log drives bringing pulpwood from upstream forests. The river still provides the water supply for paper manufacture, but environmental concerns encourage pulpwood delivery by highway and rail. Canadian corporation Twin Rivers (originally Fraser Papers) has a large facility located in Madawaska which processes the pulp produced by the mill's other plant in Edmundston. The pulp is shipped across the border through a mile-long high pressure pipeline running between both facilities, and is made into paper in Madawaska. The Madawaska mill specializes in fine-grade papers. The town's economy is highly dependent upon cross-border trade, to the extent that Madawaska and its larger sister city of Edmundston are considered by residents under many aspects, a single economic entity.

Madawaska is also home to the St. John Valley Times, a popular weekly newspaper circulated across Aroostook County.

Geography

Madawaska is located beside the Saint John River, the Canada–United States border. Four Corners Park commemorates its location as the most northeastern town in the contiguous United States. The town is served by U.S. Route 1.

Climate

This climatic region is typified by large seasonal temperature differences, with warm to hot (and often humid) summers and cold (sometimes severely cold) winters.  According to the Köppen Climate Classification system, Madawaska has a humid continental climate, abbreviated "Dfb" on climate maps.

Demographics

2010 census

As of the census of 2010, there were 4,035 people, 1,983 households, and 1,128 families living in the town. The racial makeup of the town was 98.4% White, 0.2% African American, 0.5% Native American, 0.2% Asian, and 0.6% from two or more races. Hispanic or Latino of any race were 0.5% of the population.

There were 1,983 households, of which 20.1% had children under the age of 18 living with them, 47.2% were married couples living together, 6.5% had a female householder with no husband present, 3.2% had a male householder with no wife present, and 43.1% were non-families. 38.8% of all households were made up of individuals, and 19.6% had someone living alone who was 65 years of age or older. The average household size was 2.00 and the average family size was 2.62.

The median age in the town was 51.2 years. 16.7% of residents were under the age of 18; 4.4% were between the ages of 18 and 24; 18.5% were from 25 to 44; 34.1% were from 45 to 64; and 26.2% were 65 years of age or older. The gender makeup of the town was 49.1% male and 50.9% female.

2000 census

As of the census of 2000, there were 4,534 people, 1,993 households, and 1,301 families living in the town. The racial makeup of the town was 98.08% White, 0.15% Black, 0.44% Native American, 0.68% Asian, 0.09% from other races, and 0.55% from two or more races. Hispanic or Latino of any race were 0.20% of the population.

There were 1,993 households, out of which 26.0% had children under the age of 18 living with them, 56.8% were married couples living together, 6.0% had a female householder with no husband present, and 34.7% were non-families. 30.8% of all households were made up of individuals, and 13.2% had someone living alone who was 65 years of age or older.  The average household size was 2.22 and the average family size was 2.77.

In the town, the population was spread out, with 20.4% under the age of 18, 5.2% from 18 to 24, 25.3% from 25 to 44, 30.1% from 45 to 64, and 19.0% who were 65 years of age or older.  The median age was 44 years. For every 100 females, there were 91.3 males.  For every 100 females age 18 and over, there were 91.1 males.

The median income for a household in the town was $30,994, and the median income for a family was $42,269. Males had a median income of $46,117 versus $22,361 for females. The per capita income for the town was $18,552.  About 7.5% of families and 11.5% of the population were below the poverty line, including 13.9% of those under age 18 and 11.8% of those age 65 or over. The median home value is $102,935.

Education

Madawaska's schools serve Madawaska, St. David, and Grand Isle.  The Madawaska Elementary School has students from pre-kindergarten through the 6th grade.  Madawaska Middle/High School contains grades 7 through 12.

Notable people 

 Ashley Hebert, The Bachelorette Season 7
 Emilien Levesque, Maine state legislator
 Charles Theriault, Maine state legislator
 Roland White, bluegrass musician

See also

 French language in the United States

References

External links

 Town of Madawaska, Maine
 Madawaska Public Library
 Madawaska Historical Society
 Madawaska Acadian Festival
 Madawaska School Department
 Madawaska Four Corners Park

 
Towns in Aroostook County, Maine
Towns in Maine
Populated places on the Saint John River (Bay of Fundy)
French-Canadian culture in Maine